Bobo-Tiénigbé (also spelled Bobo-Tieningboué) is a village in north-central Ivory Coast. It is in the sub-prefecture of Marandallah, Mankono Department, Béré Region, Woroba District.

Bobo-Tiénigbé was a commune until March 2012, when it became one of 1126 communes nationwide that were abolished.

Notes

Former communes of Ivory Coast
Populated places in Woroba District
Populated places in Béré Region